Alverton is an unincorporated community in Westmoreland County, Pennsylvania, United States. Alverton has a post office, with ZIP code 15612.

History
According to historian John Boucher, the village was originally called Stonerville. A Mennonite congregation built a log meeting house there in the early 1800s, and a brick meeting house in 1841.  

Boucher states that Alverton was located along the "South-West Branch" of the Pennsylvania Railroad, which began at Greensburg.

The village was the site of two coal mines, known as Donnelly and Mayfield, which began operations in 1878. At one point, more than three hundred people worked in those two mines. Coke ovens were also located at the site. Coking continued at Alverton until 1983.

A study published in 1994 found seven company-built houses and a former hotel, thought to date to the 1880s and 1900 respectively, still in existence, together with coke ovens of more recent vintage.

References

Unincorporated communities in Westmoreland County, Pennsylvania
Unincorporated communities in Pennsylvania